Ban Kenpha is a village in Houaphanh Province, northeastern Laos. It is to the northeast of Vieng Kham, not far from Muang Xon.

References

Populated places in Houaphanh Province